Tango Balekile (born 7 March 1996) is a South African rugby union player for the  in the Pro14 and the  in the Currie Cup and in the Rugby Challenge. His regular position is hooker.

Rugby career

2012–14: Schools rugby

Balekile was born in East London and also grew up there, attending Selborne College. He captained and played rugby for them which resulted in a number or provincial call-ups to represent the Border Rugby Union at various tournaments. In 2012 he played for their Under-16 team at the Grant Khomo Week held in Johannesburg, in 2013 he played for their Under-18 team at the Academy Week held at Glenwood High School in Durban and in 2014, he captained and played for their Craven Week team at the tournament held in Middelburg.

2015: Eastern Province Under-19

Prior to the 2015 season, Balekile moved to Port Elizabeth to join the  academy. He was included in the  squad that competed in Group A of the 2015 Under-19 Provincial Championship. After starting against  and appearing as a replacement against , he then firmly established himself as their first-choice hooker, starting their remaining eight matches during the regular season. Eastern Province won eleven of their twelve matches to finish top of the log and to qualify for a home semi-final.

2016: Eastern Province Kings, NMMU Madibaz and South Africa Under-20

At the start of 2016, Balekile played rugby for university side  in the Varsity Cup competition.

In March 2016, he was included in a South Africa Under-20 training squad, also making the cut for a reduced provisional squad named a week later. On 10 May 2016, he was included in the final South Africa Under-20 squad for the 2016 World Rugby Under 20 Championship tournament to be held in Manchester, England. He started their opening match in Pool C of the tournament as South Africa came from behind to beat Japan 59–19, and also started their next pool match as South Africa were beaten 13–19 by Argentina. He dropped to the bench for their final pool match, coming on shortly after half-time as South Africa bounced back to secure a 40-31 bonus-point victory over France to secure a semi-final place as the best runner-up in the competition. He was restored to the starting line-up for the semi-final, as South Africa faced three-time champions England. The hosts proving too strong for South Africa, knocking them out of the competition with a 39–17 victory. Balekile was again named on the bench against, due to injury  Argentina for the third-place play-off match, again coming on just after half-time as Argentina beat South Africa – as they did in the pool stages – convincingly winning 49–19 and in the process condemning South Africa to fourth place in the competition.

References

1996 births
Living people
Eastern Province Elephants players
Falcons (rugby union) players
Rugby union hookers
Rugby union players from East London, Eastern Cape
South Africa Under-20 international rugby union players
South African rugby union players
Southern Kings players
Pumas (Currie Cup) players